Rena L. Moran (born April 13, 1960) is an American politician and member of the Minnesota House of Representatives. A member of the Minnesota Democratic–Farmer–Labor Party (DFL), she represents District 65A, which includes portions of the city of Saint Paul in Ramsey County in the Twin Cities metropolitan area.

Early life, education, and career
Moran graduated from Southern Illinois University in Carbondale, Illinois, where she received a B.S. in Early Childhood Education. She overcame homelessness when she and her six children first arrived to Minnesota. She recently worked as a Parent Leader Coordinator for Prevent Child Abuse Minnesota.

Minnesota House of Representatives
Moran was first elected to the House in 2010 and was re-elected in 2012.

Personal life
Moran is married and has seven children.

References

External links

 Rep. Moran Web Page
 Project Votesmart - Rep. Rena Moran Profile
 Rena Moran Campaign Web Site

Living people
1960 births
Politicians from Chicago
Politicians from Saint Paul, Minnesota
Southern Illinois University alumni
Democratic Party members of the Minnesota House of Representatives
African-American state legislators in Minnesota
African-American women in politics
Women state legislators in Minnesota
21st-century American politicians
21st-century American women politicians
21st-century African-American women
21st-century African-American politicians
20th-century African-American people
20th-century African-American women